The Squad is a group of nine Democratic members of the U.S. House of Representatives. It was initially composed of four women elected in the 2018 United States House of Representatives elections: Alexandria Ocasio-Cortez (aka AOC) of New York, Ilhan Omar of Minnesota, Ayanna Pressley of Massachusetts, and Rashida Tlaib of Michigan. They have since been joined by Jamaal Bowman of New York and Cori Bush of Missouri following the 2020 United States House of Representatives elections, and Summer Lee of Pennsylvania, and Greg Casar of Texas following the 2022 United States House of Representatives elections. The Squad is well known for being among the most progressive and left-wing members of the United States Congress.

All were elected under the age of 50, have been supported by the Justice Democrats political action committee, and are on the left wing of the Democratic Party. Ocasio-Cortez, Pressley, Bush and Bowman were initially elected to Congress after unseating incumbents in primary challenges. All but Lee represent safe seats with Cook Partisan Voting Index scores of at least D+20.

The Squad has been said to represent the advocacy of progressive policies by the younger political generation, such as Medicare for All and the Green New Deal, which have sometimes clashed with their party's leadership. Ocasio-Cortez coined the "Squad" name in an Instagram post a week after the 2018 election. The photo, taken at a VoteRunLead event where the four founding members spoke, subsequently went viral.

Name
The colloquial use of the word "squad" arose from East Coast hip hop culture and describes "a self-chosen group of people that you want to identify with". Its use by Ocasio-Cortez signaled familiarity with millennial slang as a playful reference to youth social cliques. Ocasio-Cortez's home borough of The Bronx was the origin of hip hop. Musical acts with "Squad" in their name and lyrics existed from the 1990s to the present.

The New York Times considers the Squad to be sui generis, not fitting neatly into the usual types of congressional groups: the gang (a bipartisan group focused on particular legislation) or the caucus (a pressure group based on special interests). It notes that the term, with a militaristic connotation, conveys values of self-defense, allegiance, and having "something important to protect". The moniker has been used pejoratively by some Republicans, but the four original women use the term self-referentially to express solidarity among themselves and with supporters. For example, the Justice Democrats tweeted a quote from Pressley saying: "We are more than four people... Our squad includes any person committed to creating a more equitable and just world."

The average age of the Squad was 38.3 years as of mid-2019, nearly two decades younger than the overall House average age of 57.6 years.

History

2018 election 
Ocasio-Cortez and Pressley defeated Joe Crowley and Mike Capuano, respectively, in primary elections. Omar won the seat previously held by Democrat Keith Ellison, who retired from the House to successfully run for Attorney General of Minnesota, and Tlaib won the seat once held by Dean of the House John Conyers, who resigned in December 2017 after nearly 53 years in Congress. At least three of the squad members provided fundraising and volunteer assistance during the election campaigns of other members.

According to Pressley, she and Ocasio-Cortez had met before Freshman Orientation Week for the 116th United States Congress. During that event a week after Election Day, on November 12, 2018, all four members of the Squad participated in a livestreamed interview with Jodi Jacobson from Rewire.News, organized by VoteRunLead, and took a group picture. Ocasio-Cortez published the picture on Instagram, labeling it "Squad"; Pressley published the photo on her Instagram story the same day. The next day, they had already attracted negative attention in conservative media, as Laura Ingraham of Fox News called them "the four horsewomen of the apocalypse". The four women, known for their social media savvy, regularly defend each other's policies and remarks.

After publication, Ocasio-Cortez's Squad photo became a viral phenomenon, and public figures began using "The Squad" to refer collectively to the four women, with prominent examples of usage coming from New York Times columnist Maureen Dowd and White House counselor Kellyanne Conway. Dowd had used the term in an interview with House speaker Nancy Pelosi, who criticized the four members of the Squad collectively, although without naming them. Another photo of the three members who served on the House Oversight Committee during Michael Cohen's testimony also got viral attention.

On July 14, 2019, President Donald Trump tweeted that the members of the Squad should "go back and help fix the totally broken and crime infested places from which they came. Then come back and show us how it is done". The insinuation that people of color are foreign was widely viewed as racist; three of the four are American-born and the fourth (Omar) became a naturalized citizen in her youth. On July 15, the four women responded in a press conference, saying "We are here to stay."

On July 16, the House of Representatives condemned Trump's remarks in H.Res. 489. Over the following days, Trump continued to attack the four congresswomen, saying at a July 17 campaign rally: "They never have anything good to say. That's why I say, 'Hey if you don't like it, let 'em leave, let 'em leave.' ... I think in some cases they hate our country." While Trump was criticizing Omar, the North Carolina crowd reacted by chanting, "Send her back, Send her back!" Trump also falsely claimed that the four congresswomen had used the term "evil Jews"; none of them have been reported to have used the term. The same day, the Republican party launched a political advertisement against the Squad, titled "Squad Goals: Anarchy" and focusing on the Squad's role in the Abolish ICE movement.

A CBS News and YouGov poll of almost 2,100 American adults conducted from July 17 to 19 found that Republican respondents were more aware about the four Democratic congresswomen than Democratic respondents. The congresswomen have very unfavorable ratings among Republican respondents and favorable ratings among Democratic respondents.
In a New York Times opinion piece the historian Barbara Ransby wrote, "The squad has tilled new ground in reanimating a fighting spirit within the Democratic Party and revived its left flank."

In late July 2019, the Illinois Republican County Chairmen's Association labelled the four congresswomen as the "Jihad Squad" in a Facebook post that was later deleted. Illinois Republican Party Chairman Tim Schneider condemned "evoking race or religion as the basis for political disagreement".

In August 2019, Israel blocked Omar and Tlaib from visiting the country, a reversal from the July 2019 statement from Israeli Ambassador to the United States Ron Dermer that "any member of Congress" would be allowed in. A spokesman for Israeli Interior Minister Arye Deri attributed the ban to Omar and Tlaib's support for BDS (Boycott, Divestment and Sanctions). A spokesman for Israeli Prime Minister Benjamin Netanyahu cited that Omar and Tlaib only intended to visit the Palestinian Territories and had not scheduled a meeting with any Israeli politicians. Less than two hours before the ban, American President Donald Trump had tweeted that Israel allowing the visit would "show great weakness" when Omar and Tlaib "hate Israel & all Jewish people". Omar responded that Netanyahu had caved to Trump's demand and that "Trump's Muslim ban is what Israel is implementing". Tlaib described the blockage as "weakness". American legislators from both the Democratic and Republican parties criticized the Israeli decision, and requested that Israel withdraw the ban. Trump applauded Israel's decision while continuing his criticism of Omar and Tlaib; he described them as "the face of the Democrat Party, and they HATE Israel". A day after the ban was imposed, Tlaib was granted permission to enter Israel to visit her family after she "committed to accept all the demands of Israel to respect the restrictions imposed on her in the visit" and "promised not to advance boycotts against Israel during the visit." In response, Tlaib said that she would not visit Israel, tweeting that doing so would "stand against everything [she] believe[s] infighting against racism, oppression, and injustice."

2020 election 
Ocasio-Cortez, Omar, and Tlaib endorsed Bernie Sanders for president in 2020, while Pressley endorsed Elizabeth Warren.

'The Squad Victory Fund', a joint action committee, was set up by the Squad to raise money for their individual campaigns and other progressive campaigns in July 2020.

All four members once again won the Democratic nomination for their districts in 2020. Pressley was unchallenged in her primary, while Ocasio-Cortez, Tlaib and Omar defeated their respective challengers, including Tlaib's House predecessor (Brenda Jones) by large margins.

On January 3, 2021, Cori Bush and Jamaal Bowman joined the Squad at the start of the 117th United States Congress. Both successfully challenged incumbent Democrats in their primaries – Lacy Clay and Eliot Engel, respectively. Bush posted a photo on Twitter of herself, Bowman, and the four original Squad members with the caption "Squad up."

Infrastructure Bill and Build Back Better Act 
On November 5, 2021, all six members of the Squad voted against the Infrastructure Investment and Jobs Act because they believed that moderate Democrats in the House and Senators Joe Manchin and Kyrsten Sinema would not vote for the Build Back Better Act. Nine Democrats in the House had previously refused to vote for the Build Back Better Act until the infrastructure bill was signed, and both Manchin and Sinema had expressed opposition to key aspects of the Build Back Better Act. After resolving certain disagreements, the infrastructure bill passed in the House with the votes of every Democrat except the members of the Squad.

2022 election 
All six members once again won the Democratic nomination for their districts in 2022. Pressley was once again unchallenged in her primary, as was Ocasio-Cortez, while Tlaib, Bush, and Bowman all garnered over 60% of the vote in their respective primaries. Ilhan Omar faced significant opposition from moderate local officials in her district, most notably from Minneapolis Mayor Jacob Frey. Her endorsement of a challenger during his 2021 reelection campaign drew the mayor's ire. Despite the backlash, Omar won the primary by a narrow 2.1% margin.

After Lee, Casar, and Ramirez won their respective primaries, it was reported that the three incoming members could join the Squad as well.

Membership
The four original members of the Squad had already been discussed as a group, even before the name was widely adopted. However, according to Mediaite, the news media currently uses "Squad" to refer to the group "almost exclusively".

Suggested members 

It was suggested that Marie Newman, who successfully challenged an incumbent member of the House of Representatives with Justice Democrats' backing, as well as Mondaire Jones, who initially challenged an incumbent and subsequently won the primary after the incumbent announced her retirement, were thought of as potentially members of the Squad. Ritchie Torres was another person named as a potential member, but Torres said he had "no intention of joining The Squad."

Becca Balint, Delia Ramirez and Maxwell Frost, who won Democratic primaries in safe Democratic seats in 2022, have been named as potential Squad members.

See also 

 Women in the United States House of Representatives

References

2019 in American politics
116th United States Congress
Factions in the Democratic Party (United States)
Left-wing populism in the United States
Political terminology of the United States
Progressivism in the United States
Alexandria Ocasio-Cortez